A quinceañera is a young Latina woman's celebration of her fifteenth birthday.

Quinceañera may also refer to:

Film 
 Quinceañera (film), a 2006 drama
 La Quinceañera (film), a 2007 documentary

Music 
 "Quinceañera", a song by Timbiriche written for the 1987 telenovela

Television 
 Quinceañera: Mama Quiero Ser Artista (singing competition), a reality TV show broadcast by Telemundo
 Quinceañera (1987 TV series), a Mexican telenovela
 Quinceañera (upcoming TV series), an upcoming Mexican telenovela

Episodes 
 "Quinceañera", an episode of the TV series Wizards of Waverly Place
 "Quinceañera", an episode of [the TV series The Fosters
 "Quinceañera" (Superstore), an episode of the TV series Superstore